The 2019 City of Playford Tennis International II was a professional tennis tournament played on outdoor hard courts. It was the third edition of the tournament which was part of the 2019 ATP Challenger Tour and the 2019 ITF Women's World Tennis Tour. It took place in the City of Playford, Australia between 28 October and 3 November 2019.

Men's singles main-draw entrants

Seeds

Other entrants
The following players received wildcards into the singles main draw:
  Matthew Dellavedova
  Calum Puttergill
  Tristan Schoolkate
  Dane Sweeny
  Brandon Walkin

The following player received entry into the singles main draw using a protected ranking:
  Bradley Mousley

The following players received entry from the qualifying draw:
  Mislav Bosnjak
  James Ibrahim

Women's singles main-draw entrants

Seeds

 1 Rankings are as of 21 October 2019.

Other entrants
The following players received wildcards into the singles main draw:
  Isabella Bozicevic
  Taylah Lawless
  Annerly Poulos
  Storm Sanders

The following players received entry from the qualifying draw:
  Mana Ayukawa
  Alison Bai
  Alexandra Bozovic
  Gabriella Da Silva-Fick
  Jennifer Elie
  Amber Marshall
  Alana Parnaby
  Alicia Smith

Champions

Men's singles

 James Duckworth def.  Yasutaka Uchiyama 7–6(7–2), 6–4.

Women's singles

 Storm Sanders def.  Lizette Cabrera, 6–3, 6–4

Men's doubles

 Harri Heliövaara /  Patrik Niklas-Salminen def.  Ruben Gonzales /  Evan King 6–4, 6–7(4–7), [10–7].

Women's doubles

 Asia Muhammad /  Storm Sanders def.  Naiktha Bains /  Tereza Mihalíková, 6–3, 6–4

References

External links
 2019 City of Playford Tennis International II at ITFtennis.com
 Official website

2019 ITF Women's World Tennis Tour
2019 ATP Challenger Tour
2019 in Australian tennis
October 2019 sports events in Australia
November 2019 sports events in Australia